Municipality of Badiraguato is a municipality in Sinaloa in northwestern Mexico. The seat of the municipality is in the small town of Badiraguato.

The municipality is in the Sierra Madre Occidental.

Political subdivision 
Badiraguato Municipality is subdivided in 15 sindicaturas:
El Varejonal
Ciénega de los Lara
Cortijos de Guaténipa
Otatillos
Higueras de Teófilo Álvarez Borboa
San Nicolás del Sitio
Santiago de los Caballeros
San Javier
San José del Llano
Huixiopa
San Luis Gonzaga
Potrero de Bejarano
Surutato
Santa Rita
Tameapa

Notable people from Badiraguato Municipality
 Arturo Beltrán Leyva, Mexican drug kingpin and one of the founders of Beltrán Leyva Cartel (born in Badiraguato)
 Alfredo Beltrán Leyva, Mexican drug kingpin and one of the founders of Beltrán Leyva Cartel (born in Badiraguato)
 Carlos Beltrán Leyva, Mexican drug kingpin and one of the founders of Beltrán Leyva Cartel (born in Badiraguato)
 Héctor Beltrán Leyva, Mexican drug kingpin and one of the founders of Beltrán Leyva Cartel (born in Badiraguato)
 Rafael Caro Quintero, Mexican drug kingpin, one of the founders of Guadalajara Cartel and older brother of Miguel Caro Quintero (founder and leader of Sonora Cartel)
 Ernesto Fonseca Carrillo, Mexican drug kingpin, one of the founders of Guadalajara Cartel and uncle of Amado Carrillo Fuentes a.k.a. "El Señor de los Cielos" ("The Lord of Skies"), founder and former head of Juárez Cartel
 Juan José Esparragoza Moreno, Mexican drug kingpin and one of the founders and leaders of Sinaloa Cartel
 Joaquín "El Chapo" Guzmán, Mexican drug kingpin, and one of the founders and leaders of Sinaloa Cartel

References

Municipalities of Sinaloa